Lin Yongjian (born 14 February 1970) is a Chinese actor.
 
Lin, Yongjian graduated from PRC Academy of Drama in 1990, has been a successful stage actor at Guangzhou Soldiers' Drama Troupe after graduation. He has been starring in more than 50 comedies and movies and has been well-received as best supporting actor, best actor, best performer in many awards.

Films

Awards

References

Living people
1970 births
20th-century Chinese male actors
21st-century Chinese male actors
Male actors from Qingdao
Chinese male film actors
Chinese male television actors
Chinese male voice actors